The Colonial Athletic Association women's basketball tournament has been held every year since 1984.  The winner receives an automatic berth into the NCAA Women's Division I Basketball Championship.

Tournament champions

Tournament championships by school

‡Former member of the CAA

See also
Colonial Athletic Association men's basketball tournament

References